Joseph Thomas Browne (born March 6, 1947) ended a 50-year career at the National Football League office on March 31, 2016, as the longest-serving employee ever in that office.

After his retirement, Browne was honored twice by the Pro Football Hall of Fame. He received the prestigious Ralph Hay Pioneer Award in August 2016. The Award is presented periodically by the Hall to a person who has made significant and innovative contributions to pro football. In 2022, Browne also was honored as a member of the Charter Class for the Hall’s new “Awards of Excellence” program. This award was given in recognition of outstanding contributions to pro football’s growth, safety, popularity and its overall success on the field and behind the scenes.

NFL employment

Browne began his NFL work as a 17-year-old college intern in 1965. Nearing his NFL retirement, he told younger colleagues they should consider changing their career path every 50 years or so if for no other reason than to stay fresh.
After serving on active duty in the United States Marine Corps, he became a full-time NFL employee in 1970 and was named to several key front office posts by then-commissioner Pete Rozelle during the next 20 years.

Browne later was appointed the NFL's first-ever vice president by then-commissioner Paul Tagliabue in April, 1990. He was promoted to senior vice president in 1995 and executive vice president of communications & government affairs in 2002.

Browne’s league-wide areas of responsibility during his career included NFL media relations, public affairs and community relations in North America and overseas. He also served as chief liaison for the NFL clubs in Congressional, military and government agency-related matters in Washington, D.C.

Browne’s specific responsibilities included generating international publicity and media coverage for the annual Super Bowl, the most popular and most watched one-day sporting event in North America. He attended 50 straight Super Bowl games. Super Bowl Sunday has evolved into an unofficial winter holiday in the USA. The Super Bowl annually attracts more than 5,000 members of an international media corps and is televised to 175 countries and territories in 25 languages.

Browne became senior advisor to Commissioner Roger Goodell in 2010. He spent his final NFL years in that position primarily working with the league’s 20,000-plus retired players. “We in the NFL are fortunate to have thousands of players who have become successful in their post playing careers,” Browne says. “We also have programs in place to help other alumni who may be struggling.”

Awards and boards

Browne now heads the New York-based Joe Browne Agency, which serves clients at the intersection of sports, entertainment and politics. He also serves on the international advisory board for FleishmanHillard, the global communications firm.

He serves on the board of directors of the Pat Tillman Foundation and the advisory board for the Pro Football Hall of Fame. He also was a member of the national board of governors for the United Way of America.

Browne was a charter member of the board of directors of USA Football, the governing body for amateur football in the United States. The organization in 2016 created the ‘Joe Browne Leadership Award’ which is bestowed periodically on “A Football Leader Who Is Committed To The Betterment Of Young Athletes”. Browne himself was the first recipient.

Browne also has been a recipient of the Pete Rozelle Award given by the New Orleans Touchdown Club and the Reds Bagnell Award presented by the Maxwell Club of Philadelphia.

He was presented with the Flax Trust Award in 2012 for his support of peace in Northern Ireland. He also was named a member of the Charter Class of the Top 50 Irish Personalities in Pro and College Sports by the Irish Voice in 2013.

Personal life

Browne, the son of an Irish immigrant father (John Browne) and an Irish-American mother (Margaret Reills Browne), was born in New York. He was the first scholarship basketball player at Archbishop Molloy High School (Class of ’64) in Queens, N.Y. where he is a member of his alma mater’s Hall of Fame. He is a graduate of St. Francis College (Class of ’68) in Brooklyn, N.Y.

Browne and his wife Karyn live on Long Island. They are the parents of two adult sons—Tim and Randy—and the grandparents of two grandsons—Ellis and Weston.

References 
https://www.si.com/mmqb/2016/05/17/nfl-afl-merger-joe-namath-usfl-donald-trump-paul-tagliabue-roger-goodell

https://www.sportsbusinessdaily.com/Journal/Issues/2015/09/07/Opinion/Joe-Browne.aspx

https://www.usatoday.com/story/sports/nfl/2016/07/13/longtime-nfl-exec-joe-browne-wins-hall-of-fame-award/87031748/

Living people
National Football League executives
People from Queens, New York
St. Francis College alumni
1947 births